The 2011 1. divisjon (women) season kicked off on 25 April 2011, and the final round was played on 23 October 2011. 

Vålerenga were promoted to the 2011 Toppserien as 1. divisjon winners, along with Fart who finished second. This was the first time Vålerenga were playing in Toppserien, while Fart returned to the top division for the first time since 2008.

Before the season started, Orkla withdrew their team, and was replaced by Alta. Manglerud Star were bankrupted 4 April 2011, and didn't play any matches.

League table

See also 
2011 in Norwegian football
2011 Toppserien

References

2011
2
Norway
Norway